Puffin Browser is a remote browser developed by CloudMosa, an American mobile technology company founded by Shioupyn Shen.

Puffin Browser was initially released in 2010. It uses encrypted cloud servers for content processing. Because it renders webpages in the cloud, it could, according to some benchmark tests, make page loading, content rendering, and JavaScript execution faster than local device processing. However, due to the web pages processed through cloud servers, when the user is browsing the World Wide Web on the Puffin Web Browser, the cloud server's IP address is seen by the website. It relays the network identity of its users to the websites they visit by adding an extra XFF (X-Forwarded-For) header in each HTTP request containing the user's mobile device's IP address. For websites that did not support the XFF header, Puffin Browser is treated as a proxy server.

Puffin Browser comes with Adobe Flash Player to play Adobe Flash content, including on mobile devices, where Flash was discontinued due to security issues. The features also include a virtual trackpad, gamepad, and on-screen keyboard functions.

Puffin Browser products from CloudMosa are offered for several different platforms: Puffin Browser on Android (and formerly iOS), Puffin Secure Browser on Windows and on macOS, Puffin Internet Terminal on Linux, Puffin TV Browser on smart TV, and Puffin OS on mainstream smartphones.) Puffin Browser is also known to run on resource-limited hardware like Raspberry Pi, and set-top boxes.

In May 2019, they had announced that they would discontinue the Puffin Web Browser app on iOS devices due to Apple's App Store policies. However, CloudMosa has released Puffin Web Browser Lite for iOS devices which does not have Adobe Flash Player Support.

History 
Puffin Browser released its paid version Puffin Web Browser Pro on Google Play in December 2010, and on Apple App Store in November 2010.

In 2013, CloudMosa introduced Puffin Academy, a free mobile browser with built-in Adobe Flash for K-12 students, teachers, and parents. However, the iOS version of Puffin Academy was discontinued on July 1, 2019.

In 2015, they released a new product, Puffin for Facebook.

In 2017, the Puffin Browser was the top utility application in the App Store across 58 countries including France, the United Kingdom, Japan, Italy and South Korea.

In May 2018, ad blocking features were added to the Pro version which do not exist in the free version. Before that, the only difference was a smaller limit on downloading.

In June 2018, CloudMosa announced that because Puffin Web Browser updates were being rejected by Apple, they had therefore released a separate lightweight browser app for iOS devices, Puffin Browser Lite, which is based on iOS WebKit and does not support Adobe Flash Player.
They later announced that they would be discontinuing the original Puffin Web Browser apps on July 1, 2019 on all iOS devices because of the block on updates, citing Apple's app review guideline 2.5.6. The shutdown was later pushed back to October 1, 2019, and the free version of the original browser app was finally discontinued on November 20, 2019. CloudMosa said on Facebook that the paid version on iOS, Puffin Browser Pro, would remain available but with no updates.

Puffin TV Browser is a edition of Puffin Browser optimized for Android TV users. It is ranked the best browser for Android TV by MakeUseOf. Thailand's largest GSM mobile phone operator, Advanced Info Service (AIS), ships a customized version of Puffin TV Browser in their set-top box—AIS Playbox.

Before 2018, the Puffin Browser product family was only available on mobile devices. Starting from 2018, Puffin Browser released a desktop version, Puffin Secure Browser for Windows. In May 2019, Puffin Secure Browser for macOS was released.

As of October 24, 2018, it has reached over 50 million users on Android. As of November 2018, Puffin browser has reached 100 million accumulated users worldwide.

Right before the opening of CES 2019, CloudMosa announced a new Puffin Browser product family member—Puffin Internet Terminal. It's a desktop virtualization app running on Raspbian for Internet surfing designed for Raspberry Pi. Puffin Internet Terminal was selected as a CES 2019 Innovation Awards Honoree in the Computer Hardware and Components product category. Later in August 2021, Puffin Internet Terminal was rebranded as Puffin Cloud Learning and released as a demo version that does not require a subscription to support students learning at home during the COVID-19  shelter-in-place. 

In May 2019, CloudMosa introduced a new family member—Puffin OS, a cloud-based operating system that would make low-cost mobile phones work as fast as high-end hardware. A Kickstarter project met its modest target. However, independent review website GSM Arena expressed skepticism.

In 2020 the Puffin Android TV browser became a subscription service.

Products

Puffin Web Browser 
Puffin Web Browser is the standard Puffin Browser application for Android and formerly iOS. The Puffin web browser on Android includes support for Adobe Flash content and features such as mouse cursor emulation and a virtual gamepad. Users are able to choose where to save a downloaded file, either to users' devices or directly to their storage drive. The web browser also allows users to reduce the amount of data being used, from sources such as Flash games that often consume a lot of data.

Puffin Web Browser Lite
Puffin Browser Lite is the standard Puffin application for iOS devices. It is similar to the Puffin Web Browser for Android devices; however, does not support Adobe Flash Player. It comes with workspaces and password protection.

Concerns 
Because web pages render through the remote browser in the cloud, user traffic is passed via the Puffin servers. Some users criticize that their personal data such as passwords may be logged by Puffin.  However, Puffin's privacy policy states that no web page's content is logged by them and that they do not have access to users' passwords.

References

External links 
 
 Puffin Browser's developer site

Android (operating system) software
Client/server split web browsers
Discontinued iOS software
JavaScript
Mobile web browsers
Web browsers
Year of introduction missing